In the mathematical fields of differential geometry and geometric analysis, the Ricci flow, sometimes also referred to as Hamilton's Ricci flow, is a certain partial differential equation for a Riemannian metric. It is often said to be analogous to the diffusion of heat and the heat equation, due to formal similarities in the mathematical structure of the equation. However, it is nonlinear and exhibits many phenomena not present in the study of the heat equation.

The Ricci flow, so named for the presence of the Ricci tensor in its definition, was introduced by Richard Hamilton, who used it through the 1980s to prove striking new results in Riemannian geometry. Later extensions of Hamilton's methods by various authors resulted in new applications to geometry, including the resolution of the differentiable sphere conjecture by Simon Brendle and Richard Schoen.

Following Shing-Tung Yau's suggestion that the singularities of solutions of the Ricci flow could identify the topological data predicted by William Thurston's geometrization conjecture, Hamilton produced a number of results in the 1990s which were directed towards the conjecture's resolution. In 2002 and 2003, Grigori Perelman presented a number of fundamental new results about the Ricci flow, including a novel variant of some technical aspects of Hamilton's program. Hamilton and Perelman's works are now widely regarded as forming a proof of the Thurston conjecture, including as a special case the Poincaré conjecture, which had been a well-known open problem in the field of geometric topology since 1904. Their results are considered as a milestone in the fields of geometry and topology.

Mathematical definition 
On a smooth manifold , a smooth Riemannian metric  automatically determines the Ricci tensor .
 Given a smooth manifold  and an open real interval , a Ricci flow assigns, to each  in the interval , a Riemannian metric  on  such that .
The Ricci tensor is often thought of as an average value of the sectional curvatures, or as an algebraic trace of the Riemann curvature tensor. However, for the analysis of existence and uniqueness of Ricci flows, it is extremely significant that the Ricci tensor can be defined, in local coordinates, by a formula involving the first and second derivatives of the metric tensor. This makes the Ricci flow into a geometrically-defined partial differential equation. The analysis of the ellipticity of the local coordinate formula provides the foundation for the existence of Ricci flows; see the following section for the corresponding result.

Let  be a nonzero number. Then . So, with this very trivial change of parameters, the number −2 appearing in the definition of the Ricci flow could be replaced by any other nonzero number. For this reason, the use of −2 can be regarded as an arbitrary convention, albeit one which essentially every paper and exposition on Ricci flow follows. The only significant difference is that if −2 were replaced by a positive number, then the existence theorem discussed in the following section would become a theorem which produces a Ricci flow that moves backwards (rather than forwards) in parameter values from initial data.

The parameter  is usually called , although this is only as part of standard informal terminology in the mathematical field of partial differential equations. It is not physically meaningful terminology. In fact, in the standard quantum field theoretic interpretation of the Ricci flow in terms of the renormalization group, the parameter  corresponds to length or energy, rather than time.

Normalized Ricci flow
Define  so that each of the Riemannian metrics  has volume 1; this is possible since  is compact. (More generally, it would be possible if each Riemannian metric  had finite volume.) Since  is positive-valued,  is a bijection onto its image . Now the Riemannian metrics , defined for parameters , satisfy

Here  denotes scalar curvature. This is called the normalized Ricci flow equation. Thus, with an explicitly defined change of scale  and a reparametrization of the parameter values, a Ricci flow can be converted into a normalized Ricci flow. The converse also holds, by reversing the above calculations.

The primary reason for considering the normalized Ricci flow is that it allows a convenient statement of the major convergence theorems for Ricci flow. However, it is not essential to do so, and for virtually all purposes it suffices to consider Ricci flow in its standard form. Moreover, the normalized Ricci flow is not generally meaningful on noncompact manifolds.

Existence and uniqueness
Making use of the Nash–Moser implicit function theorem,  showed the following existence theorem:
He showed the following uniqueness theorem:
The existence theorem provides a one-parameter family of smooth Riemannian metrics. In fact, any such one-parameter family also depends smoothly on the parameter.

Dennis DeTurck subsequently gave a proof of the above results which uses the Banach implicit function theorem instead. His work is essentially a simpler Riemannian version of Yvonne Choquet-Bruhat's well-known proof and interpretation of well-posedness for the Einstein equations in Lorentzian geometry.

Convergence theorems

Hamilton's proof, inspired by and loosely modeled upon James Eells and Joseph Sampson's epochal 1964 paper on convergence of the harmonic map heat flow, included many novel features, such as an extension of the maximum principle to the setting of symmetric 2-tensors. His paper (together with that of Eells−Sampson) is among the most widely cited in the field of differential geometry.

The full positive case was demonstrated by Bennett , in an extension of Hamilton's techniques. Since any Ricci flow on a two-dimensional manifold is confined to a single conformal class, it can be recast as a partial differential equation for a scalar function on the fixed Riemannian manifold . As such, the Ricci flow in this setting can also be studied by purely analytic methods; correspondingly, there are alternative non-geometric proofs of the two-dimensional convergence theorem.

The higher-dimensional case has a longer history. Soon after Hamilton's breakthrough result, Gerhard Huisken extended his methods to higher dimensions, showing that if  almost has constant positive curvature (in the sense of smallness of certain components of the Ricci decomposition), then the normalized Ricci flow converges smoothly to constant curvature.  found a novel formulation of the maximum principle in terms of trapping by convex sets, which led to a general criterion relating convergence of the Ricci flow of positively curved metrics to the existence of "pinching sets" for a certain multidimensional ordinary differential equation. Twenty years later, Christoph Böhm and Burkhard Wilking found a new algebraic method of constructing "pinching sets," thereby removing the assumption of four-dimensionality from Hamilton's result. Simon Brendle and Richard Schoen showed that positivity of the isotropic curvature is preserved by the Ricci flow on a closed manifold; by applying Böhm and Wilking's method, they were able to derive a new Ricci flow convergence theorem. Their convergence theorem included as a special case the resolution of the differentiable sphere theorem, which at the time had been a long-standing conjecture.

Corollaries
The results in dimensions three and higher show that any smooth closed manifold  which admits a metric  of the given type must be a space form of positive curvature. Since these space forms are largely understood by work of Élie Cartan and others, one may draw corollaries such as
 Suppose that  is a smooth closed 3-dimensional manifold which admits a smooth Riemannian metric of positive Ricci curvature. If  is simply-connected then it must be diffeomorphic to the 3-sphere.
So if one could show directly that any smooth closed simply-connected 3-dimensional manifold admits a smooth Riemannian metric of positive Ricci curvature, then the Poincaré conjecture would immediately follow. However, as matters are understood at present, this result is only known as a (trivial) corollary of the Poincaré conjecture, rather than vice versa.

Possible extensions
Given any  larger than two, there exist many closed -dimensional smooth manifolds which do not have any smooth Riemannian metrics of constant curvature. So one cannot hope to be able to simply drop the curvature conditions from the above convergence theorems. It could be possible to replace the curvature conditions by some alternatives, but the existence of compact manifolds such as complex projective space, which has a metric of nonnegative curvature operator (the Fubini-Study metric) but no metric of constant curvature, makes it unclear how much these conditions could be pushed. Likewise, the possibility of formulating analogous convergence results for negatively curved Riemannian metrics is complicated by the existence of closed Riemannian manifolds whose curvature is arbitrarily close to constant and yet admit no metrics of constant curvature.

Li–Yau inequalities
Making use of a technique pioneered by Peter Li and Shing-Tung Yau for parabolic differential equations on Riemannian manifolds,  proved the following "Li–Yau inequality."
 Let  be a smooth manifold, and let  be a solution of the Ricci flow with  such that each  is complete with bounded curvature. Furthermore, suppose that each  has nonnegative curvature operator.
 showed the following alternative Li–Yau inequality.
 Let  be a smooth closed -manifold, and let  be a solution of the Ricci flow.
Both of these remarkable inequalities are of profound importance for the proof of the Poincaré conjecture and geometrization conjecture. The terms on the right hand side of Perelman's Li–Yau inequality motivates the definition of his "reduced length" functional, the analysis of which leads to his "noncollapsing theorem." The noncollapsing theorem allows application of Hamilton's compactness theorem (Hamilton 1995) to construct "singularity models," which are Ricci flows on new three-dimensional manifolds. Owing to the Hamilton–Ivey estimate, these new Ricci flows have nonnegative curvature. Hamilton's Li–Yau inequality can then be applied to see that the scalar curvature is, at each point, a nondecreasing (nonnegative) function of time. This is a powerful result that allows many further arguments to go through. In the end, Perelman shows that any of his singularity models is asymptotically like a complete gradient shrinking Ricci soliton, which are completely classified; see the previous section.

See  for details on Hamilton's Li–Yau inequality; the books  and  contain expositions of both inequalities above.

Examples

Constant-curvature and Einstein metrics
Let  be a Riemannian manifold which is Einstein, meaning that there is a number  such that .

If  is closed, then according to Hamilton's uniqueness theorem above, this is the only Ricci flow with initial data . One sees, in particular, that:
This is the simplest examples of a "finite-time singularity." 
 if  is zero, which is synonymous with  being Ricci-flat, then  is independent of time, and so the maximal interval of existence is the entire real line.
 if  is negative, then the Ricci flow "expands"  since the scale factor  is greater than 1 for all positive ; furthermore one sees that  can be taken arbitrarily large. One says that the Ricci flow, for this initial metric, is "immortal."

The Einstein condition has as a special case that of constant curvature; hence the particular examples of the sphere (with its standard metric) and hyperbolic space appear as special cases of the above.

Ricci solitons

Ricci solitons are Ricci flows that may change their size but not their shape up to diffeomorphisms.
 Cylinders Sk × Rl (for k ≥ 2) shrink self similarly under the Ricci flow up to diffeomorphisms
A significant 2-dimensional example is the cigar soliton, which is given by the metric (dx2 + dy2)/(e4t + x2 + y2) on the Euclidean plane. Although this metric shrinks under the Ricci flow, its geometry remains the same. Such solutions are called steady Ricci solitons.
 An example of a 3-dimensional steady Ricci soliton is the Bryant soliton, which is rotationally symmetric, has positive curvature, and is obtained by solving a system of ordinary differential equations.  A similar construction works in arbitrary dimension.
 There exist numerous families of Kähler manifolds, invariant under a U(n) action and birational to Cn, which are Ricci solitons. These examples were constructed by Cao and Feldman-Ilmanen-Knopf. (Chow-Knopf 2004)
 A 4-dimensional example exhibiting only torus symmetry was recently discovered by Bamler-Cifarelli-Conlon-Deruelle. 

A gradient shrinking Ricci soliton consists of a smooth Riemannian manifold (M,g) and f ∈ C∞(M) such that

In 2008, Huai-Dong Cao, Bing-Long Chen, and Xi-Ping Zhu completed the classification of these solitons, showing:
 Suppose (M,g,f) is a complete gradient shrinking Ricci soliton with dim(M) = 3. Note that if M is not simply-connected, then one may consider the universal cover  and then the above theorem applies to 

There is not yet a good understanding of gradient shrinking Ricci solitons in any higher dimensions.

Relationship to uniformization and geometrization 
Hamilton's first work on Ricci flow was published at the same time as William Thurston's geometrization conjecture, which concerns the topological classification of three-dimensional smooth manifolds. Hamilton's idea was to define a kind of nonlinear diffusion equation which would tend to smooth out irregularities in the metric. Suitable canonical forms had already been identified by Thurston; the possibilities, called Thurston model geometries, include the three-sphere S3, three-dimensional Euclidean space E3, three-dimensional hyperbolic space H3, which are homogeneous and isotropic, and five slightly more exotic Riemannian manifolds, which are homogeneous but not isotropic.  (This list is closely related to, but not identical with, the Bianchi classification of the three-dimensional real Lie algebras into nine classes.)

Hamilton succeeded in proving that any smooth closed three-manifold which admits a metric of positive Ricci curvature also admits a unique Thurston geometry, namely a spherical metric, which does indeed act like an attracting fixed point under the Ricci flow, renormalized to preserve volume. (Under the unrenormalized Ricci flow, the manifold collapses to a point in finite time.) However, this doesn't prove the full geometrization conjecture, because of the restrictive assumption on curvature.

Indeed, a triumph of nineteenth-century geometry was the proof of the uniformization theorem, the analogous topological classification of smooth two-manifolds, where Hamilton showed that the Ricci flow does indeed evolve a negatively curved two-manifold into a two-dimensional multi-holed torus which is locally isometric to the hyperbolic plane.  This topic is closely related to important topics in analysis, number theory, dynamical systems, mathematical physics, and even cosmology.

Note that the term "uniformization" suggests a kind of smoothing away of irregularities in the geometry, while the term "geometrization" suggests placing a geometry on a smooth manifold.  Geometry is being used here in a precise manner akin to Klein's notion of geometry (see Geometrization conjecture for further details).  In particular, the result of geometrization may be a geometry that is not isotropic.  In most cases including the cases of constant curvature, the geometry is unique.  An important theme in this area is the interplay between real and complex formulations.  In particular, many discussions of uniformization speak of complex curves rather than real two-manifolds.

Singularities
Hamilton showed that a compact Riemannian manifold always admits a short-time Ricci flow solution. Later Shi generalized the short-time existence result to complete manifolds of bounded curvature. In general, however, due to the highly non-linear nature of the Ricci flow equation, singularities form in finite time. These singularities are curvature singularities, which means that as one approaches the singular time the norm of the curvature tensor  blows up to infinity in the region of the singularity. A fundamental problem in Ricci flow is to understand all the possible geometries of singularities. When successful, this can lead to insights into the topology of manifolds. For instance, analyzing the geometry of singular regions that may develop in 3d Ricci flow, is the crucial ingredient in Perelman's proof the Poincare and Geometrization Conjectures.

Blow-up limits of singularities

To study the formation of singularities it is useful, as in the study of other non-linear differential equations, to consider blow-ups limits. Intuitively speaking, one zooms into the singular region of the Ricci flow by rescaling time and space. Under certain assumptions, the zoomed in flow tends to a limiting Ricci flow , called a singularity model. Singularity models are ancient Ricci flows, i.e. they can be extended infinitely into the past. Understanding the possible singularity models in Ricci flow is an active research endeavor.

Let  be a sequence of points in spacetime such that 

Then one considers the parabolically rescaled metrics

Due to the symmetry of the Ricci flow equation under parabolic dilations, the metrics  are also solutions to the Ricci flow equation. In the case that

Type I and Type II singularities
Hamilton distinguishes between Type I and Type II singularities in Ricci flow. In particular, one says a Ricci flow , encountering a singularity a time  is of Type I if
.
Otherwise the singularity is of Type II. It is known that the blow-up limits of Type I singularities are gradient shrinking Ricci solitons. In the Type II case it is an open question whether the singularity model must be a steady Ricci soliton—so far all known examples are.

Singularities in 3d Ricci flow
In 3d the possible blow-up limits of Ricci flow singularities are well-understood. By Hamilton, Perelman and recent work by Brendle, blowing up at points of maximum curvature leads to one of the following three singularity models:
 The shrinking round spherical space form 
 The shrinking round cylinder  
 The Bryant soliton
The first two singularity models arise from Type I singularities, whereas the last one arises from a Type II singularity.

Singularities in 4d Ricci flow
In four dimensions very little is known about the possible singularities, other than that the possibilities are far more numerous than in three dimensions. To date the following singularity models are known

The 4d Bryant soliton
Compact Einstein manifold of positive scalar curvature
Compact gradient Kahler–Ricci shrinking soliton
The FIK shrinker 
The BCCD shrinker 
Note that the first three examples are generalizations of 3d singularity models. The FIK shrinker models the collapse of an embedded sphere with self-intersection number −1.

Relation to diffusion 
To see why the evolution equation defining the Ricci flow is indeed a kind of nonlinear diffusion equation, we can consider the special case of (real) two-manifolds in more detail.  Any metric tensor on a two-manifold can be written with respect to an exponential isothermal coordinate chart in the form

(These coordinates provide an example of a conformal coordinate chart, because angles, but not distances, are correctly represented.)

The easiest way to compute the Ricci tensor and Laplace-Beltrami operator for our Riemannian two-manifold is to use the differential forms method of Élie Cartan.  Take the coframe field

so that metric tensor becomes

Next, given an arbitrary smooth function , compute the exterior derivative

Take the Hodge dual

Take another exterior derivative

(where we used the anti-commutative property of the exterior product).  That is,

Taking another Hodge dual gives

which gives the desired expression for the Laplace/Beltrami operator

To compute the curvature tensor, we take the exterior derivative of the covector fields making up our coframe:

From these expressions, we can read off the only independent Spin connection one-form

where we have taken advantage of the anti-symmetric property of the connection. Take another exterior derivative

This gives the curvature two-form

from which we can read off the only linearly independent component of the Riemann tensor using

Namely

from which the only nonzero components of the Ricci tensor are

From this, we find components with respect to the coordinate cobasis, namely

But the metric tensor is also diagonal, with

and after some elementary manipulation, we obtain an elegant expression for the Ricci flow:

This is manifestly analogous to the best known of all diffusion equations, the heat equation

where now  is the usual Laplacian on the Euclidean plane.
The reader may object that the heat equation is of course a linear partial differential equation—where is the promised nonlinearity in the p.d.e. defining the Ricci flow?

The answer is that nonlinearity enters because the Laplace-Beltrami operator depends upon the same function p which we used to define the metric.  But notice that the flat Euclidean plane is given by taking .  So if  is small in magnitude, we can consider it to define small deviations from the geometry of a flat plane, and if we retain only first order terms in computing the exponential, the Ricci flow on our two-dimensional almost flat Riemannian manifold becomes the usual two dimensional heat equation.  This computation suggests that, just as (according to the heat equation) an irregular temperature distribution in a hot plate tends to become more homogeneous over time, so too (according to the Ricci flow) an almost flat Riemannian manifold will tend to flatten out the same way that heat can be carried off "to infinity" in an infinite flat plate.  But if our hot plate is finite in size, and has no boundary where heat can be carried off, we can expect to homogenize the temperature, but clearly we cannot expect to reduce it to zero.  In the same way, we expect that the Ricci flow, applied to a distorted round sphere, will tend to round out the geometry over time, but not to turn it into a flat Euclidean geometry.

Recent developments

The Ricci flow has been intensively studied since 1981. Some recent work has focused on the question of precisely how higher-dimensional Riemannian manifolds evolve under the Ricci flow, and in particular, what types of parametric singularities may form.  For instance, a certain class of solutions to the Ricci flow demonstrates that neckpinch singularities will form on an evolving -dimensional metric Riemannian manifold having a certain topological property (positive Euler characteristic), as the flow approaches some characteristic time .  In certain cases, such neckpinches will produce manifolds called Ricci solitons.

For a 3-dimensional manifold, Perelman showed how to continue past the singularities using surgery on the manifold.

Kähler metrics remain Kähler under Ricci flow, and so Ricci flow has also been studied in this setting, where it is called Kähler–Ricci flow.

Notes

References 
Articles for a popular mathematical audience.

Research articles.

    Erratum.
 Revised version:

Textbooks

External links

 

1981 introductions
3-manifolds
Geometric flow
Partial differential equations
Riemannian geometry
Riemannian manifolds